The 2012 Historic Grand Prix of Monaco was the eighth running of the Historic Grand Prix of Monaco, a motor racing event for heritage Grand Prix, Voiturettes, Formula One, Formula Two and Sports cars.

Report 
Former F1 driver Arturo Merzario was entered for Race A in an Alfa Romeo 8C 35, but could not take part in any of the sessions due to mechanical issues.

Race D featured a Ferrari 1512, the car which carried Ferrari's first flat-12 engine. This car had recently been restored with the help of the original designer Mauro Forghieri; it was an early retirement due to mechanical teething problems, but was highly competitive in future events, finishing runner-up in 2016 and 2018.

Roger Wills set the fastest time in practice for Race E, but collided with another car and could not take the start of the race. Andrew Smith inherited pole position. The session was red-flagged and Duncan Dayton had no opportunity to set a representative lap time. He started the race from 22nd place but put on a storming drive, running 8th after the first lap and going on to win.

Race G saw such a large number of entries that the grid was decided by two qualifying races, with even-numbered cars forming the outside line and odd-numbered cars forming the inside line. Pole for the feature was awarded to even-numbered race winner Ben Barker. The race was red-flagged due to rain after 10 laps.

The rain also caused Race F, the final session of the day, to be shortened. Oliver Hancock ran strongly in his first race in a F1 car, only to crash on the last lap. He was still classified seventh, the first car a lap down.

Results

Summary

Série A: Pre 1952 Voiturettes and Grand Prix Cars

Série B: Pre 1961 Grand Prix Cars and F2

Série C: Pre 1953 Sports and Sports Prototypes Cars

Série D: 1961 - 1965, rear engined Grand Prix cars

Série E: Pre 1973, Formula 1, 3 litre cars (1966 - 1972)

Série F: Pre 1979 Formula 1, 3 litre cars (1973-1978)

Série G: Pre 1985 Formula 3, 2000 cc

References 

Historic motorsport events
Monaco Grand Prix
Historic Grand Prix of Monaco
Historic Grand Prix of Monaco